Henblas is an area in the  community of Llangristiolus, Anglesey, Wales, which is 130.7 miles (210.3 km) from Cardiff and 214.6 miles (345.3 km) from London.

References

See also
List of localities in Wales by population

Villages in Anglesey
Llangristiolus